David Kvasnička (born 14 April 1999) is a Czech professional ice hockey defenseman. He is currently playing for HC Skoda Plzen of the Czech Extraliga (ELH).

Playing career
Kvasnička made his Czech Extraliga debut playing with HC Plzeň during the 2015–16 Czech Extraliga season. He was later loaned to HC Stadion Litoměřice in the Czech 1. Liga.

International play

 

Kvasnička first represented the Czech Republic at the 2016 IIHF World U18 Championships. He had two assists in four games as a member of his country's first gold-medal at the 2016 Ivan Hlinka Memorial Tournament.

Kvasnička appeared in a solitary game on the blueline at the 2017 World Junior Championships. He later returned for the 2019 World Junior Championships in Vancouver, British Columbia. Kvasnička contributed with 3 points in 5 games, helping the Czech's advance to the knockout rounds, before a 3-1 elimination defeat to the United States on 2 January 2019. He was selected among the top 3 players for the Czech team in a 7th place finish.

Career statistics

Regular season and playoffs

International

References

External links

1999 births
Living people
Czech ice hockey defencemen
People from Rokycany
HC Plzeň players
Sportspeople from the Plzeň Region